Dausara is a genus of moths of the family Crambidae.

Species
Dausara chiangmai Yoshiyasu, 1995
Dausara latiterminalis Yoshiyasu, 1995
Dausara marginalis (Moore, 1877)
Dausara orionalis (Walker, 1859)
Dausara pamirensis Arora & Mandal, 1974
Dausara talliusalis Walker, 1859

References

Odontiinae
Crambidae genera
Taxa named by Francis Walker (entomologist)